Miosotis Heredia (born 1972-01-12) is a female weightlifter from the Dominican Republic. She won two medals during her career at the Pan American Games (1999 and 2003) in the women's light-heavyweight division (– 69 kg).

References
iwf ranking

1972 births
Living people
Dominican Republic female weightlifters
Weightlifters at the 1999 Pan American Games
Weightlifters at the 2003 Pan American Games
Pan American Games silver medalists for the Dominican Republic
Pan American Games bronze medalists for the Dominican Republic
Pan American Games medalists in weightlifting
Medalists at the 1999 Pan American Games
Medalists at the 2003 Pan American Games
20th-century Dominican Republic women
21st-century Dominican Republic women